The following is a list of notable individuals who were born in and/or have lived in Highlands Ranch, Colorado.

Academia 
William C. Davidon (1927-2013), physicist, political activist
Robert V. Hogg (1924-2014), statistician

Arts and entertainment
Casey Deidrick (1987- ), actor
Keri Russell (1976- ), actress

Politics

State
Frank McNulty (1973- ), Colorado state legislator

Sports

American football
Christian McCaffrey (1996- ), running back
Mike Purcell (1991- ), nose tackle
Sam Jones (1996- ), guard

Basketball
David Arnold (1990- ), shooting guard
Matt Bouldin (1988- ), shooting guard
 Jake Pemberton (1996- ), American-Israeli shooting guard in the Israeli National League
Abby Waner (1986- ), shooting guard

Soccer
Janine Beckie (1994- ), forward
Brian Cvilikas (1984- ), forward
 Ethan Horvath (1995- ), goalkeeper
Taylor Kemp (1990- ), defender
 Jacob Lissek (1992-), goalkeeper
Mallory Pugh (1998- ), forward
Chelsea Stewart (1990- ), defender, midfielder
Brad Stisser (1986- ), forward, winger

Other
Alexander Artemev (1985- ), gymnast
Richard Bachman (1987- ), ice hockey goaltender
Ty Capps (1983- ), golfer
Emily Fox (1987- ), world record-setting sport stacker
Daniel Schlereth (1986- ), baseball pitcher
Courtney Zablocki (1981- ), luger

References

Highlands Ranch, Colorado
Highlands Ranch